Wey (pronunciation: 喂 wéi, stylised as WEY) is an automotive marque owned by the Chinese automaker Great Wall Motors. Launched in 2016, the brand focused on premium crossovers and SUVs based on Haval models.

History
The name Wey is derived from Great Wall Motor chairman Wei Jianjun's surname, which is pronounced the same way.

Products

Current 

 Wey Latte, compact crossover SUV launched in 2021.
 Wey Mocha, mid-size crossover SUV launched in 2021, in replacement for VV7.
Wey Macchiato, compact crossover SUV launched in 2021, in replacement for VV5.
 Wey Blue Mountain, midsize crossover SUV launched in 2022, in replacement for VV6.

Upcoming 

 Wey Yuanming, compact crossover SUV.

Discontinued 

 Wey P8, mid-size crossover SUV (2018–2020)
 WEY Tank 300, compact off-road SUV launched in 2020, and branched off towards the TANK brand as its first model.
Wey VV5, compact crossover SUV launched in late 2017. (2017–2021)
Wey VV6, mid-size crossover SUV sized between VV7 and VV5, launched in 2018. (2018–2021)
Wey VV7 and VV7 GT, mid-size crossover SUV launched in early 2017. (2017–2021)

Gallery

References

External links
 Official site

Vehicle manufacturing companies established in 2013
Great Wall Motors
Cars of China
Chinese brands